The Stratobowl is a compact natural depression within the limits of Black Hills National Forest in South Dakota, south-west of Rapid City. In 1934–1935 it housed a stratospheric balloon launch site, initially known as Stratocamp, sponsored by the National Geographic Society and the United States Army Air Corps. In 1956–1959 the site was reused by the U.S Navy Project Strato-Lab.

Explorer balloons
In 1934 the NGS and Air Corps co-sponsored the Explorer, a manned high-altitude balloon capable of stratospheric flight. Air Corps Capt. Albert William Stevens, Capt. Orvil Arson Anderson and Maj. William E. Kepner were selected to fly the Explorer. Kepner and Anderson, experienced balloonists, were in charge of locating a suitable launch site. According to Kepner, an ideal site would be a crater or canyon, a clear grassy valley encircled with rocky ridges high enough to shield the tall balloon from any wind. Ideally, the launch site it would have a high-voltage electric line, road and rail access, "and a trout stream". Kepner and Anderson eventually located their dream canyon near Rapid City, South Dakota. City officials, fascinated by the expected publicity campaign, agreed to build a road and electric line.

Anderson directed construction of a temporary village, housing over a 100 people, with the help of the South Dakota National Guard and the army's 4th Cavalry Regiment. The central pad,  in diameter, was cushioned with sawdust to protect the fabric of the balloon as it was spread on the ground prior to inflation. Preparation for flight was regularly reported by the national press. Explorer lifted off at 6:45, July 28, 1934, an event broadcast live over the radio and watched by 30,000 spectators on site. After seven hours in flight the pilots noticed holes torn in the bottom of the gas bag; quickly losing gas, the balloon plunged into an uncontrolled dive, its gas bag disintegrating as the balloon picked up vertical speed. At  the remaining hydrogen exploded, sending the gondola in a free fall. According to Ryan, the pilots managed to bail out after the explosion, Kepner at an altitude of barely ; according to Shayler, they bailed out before the explosion; all three survived uninjured. The accident was linked to folds in the balloon's fabric that put it under extreme stress as the balloon expanded in stratosphere.

The NGS and Air Corps vowed to launch a new balloon in June 1935, but the new helium-filled Explorer II was not ready until November. Anderson, Kepner, and Stevens became the first men to view the Earth's curvature.

Strato-Lab balloons
In the 1950s, Project Manhigh and Project Strato-Lab launches were made from the man-made crater of an iron mining pit near Crosby, Minnesota, and, if weather allowed, from Fleming Field in South St. Paul, Minnesota. The Stratobowl was a backup location. There was one Stratobowl launch in 1956, three in 1958, and seven in 1959. The purpose of the flight was to gather meteorological, cosmic ray, and other scientific data necessary to improve safety at high altitudes. The purpose of the flight was to perform spectrographic analysis of the planet Venus with minimal interference from the Earth's atmosphere.

Notes and references

Sources

External links
 History from StratoCat.com.ar — The use of stratospheric balloons, the scientific research, the military field, and the aerospace activity

Ballooning
Black Hills National Forest
Landforms of Pennington County, South Dakota
1934 in South Dakota
History of aviation